Truly Indie is an "innovative distribution program" providing independent filmmakers the sales and marketing tools necessary to distribute their films by-passing traditional distribution companies. By providing a way for self-funded distribution, Truly Indie aims to enable filmmakers to "retain control" over all rights and decisions relating to their films. The program was launched by Mark Cuban and Todd Wagner's media company 2929 Entertainment in 2005 in Austin, Texas.

Business model 
Truly Indie enables theatrical distribution funded by filmmakers themselves, mainly through 2929 Entertainment's Landmark Theaters. The filmmaker pays an up front fee that covers all distribution costs (marketing, advertising, and publicity). Securing a one-week run in at least five markets, the filmmaker keeps all of box office receipts and retains all rights to their film.

Filmography - Distributor 

The Prisoner or: How I Planned to Kill Tony Blair (2007)
Maxed Out: Hard Times, Easy Credit and the Era of Predatory Lenders (2006) (dist. 2007)
51 Birch Street (2005)
Beowulf & Grendel (2005)
Fall to Grace (2005)
Cavite (2005)
Automne (2004)
The Dogwalker (2002)
Tibet: A Buddhist Trilogy (1979)

Sources 

Truly Indie official site
The launch of Truly Indie Press release
Box Office Performance for Truly Indie at The Numbers

2005 establishments in Texas
Film distributors of the United States
Entertainment companies of the United States
Companies established in 2005